The Southeast Asia Ministers of Education Organization (SEAMEO) is an intergovernmental organization of the eleven Southeast Asian countries, which was formed on 30 November 1965 by the Kingdom of Laos, Malaysia, the Philippines, Singapore, Thailand and the then Republic of Vietnam. SEAMEO aims to promote regional cooperation in the fields of education, science and culture. The current SEAMEO Director is Dr. Ethel Agnes Pascua-Valenzuela of the Philippines.

Events
SEAMEO organised the SEAMEO Mathematics Olympiad, a regional competition for young mathematicians.

Joint programs
In 2014 SEAMEO announced a joint program with the German Government called "Fit For School", the first phase running over 3 years will concentrate on basic hygiene of pre—school and primary school children, improving sanitation facilities and bringing hand-washing and tooth brushing into school.

The Director of the Regional Centre for Community Education is Niane Sivongxay.

See also
 SEAMEO RECSAM
 SEAMEO SEARCA (South East Asian Regional Center for Graduate Study and Research in Agriculture)

 SEAMEO SPAFA
 SEAMEO SEN (Regional Centre for Special Educational Needs)

References

Supranational unions
Supraorganizations
Organizations established in 1965
Education in Southeast Asia